Luis Martín-Santos Ribera (11 November 1924 – 21 January 1964) was a Spanish psychiatrist and author of  (Time of Silence), often cited as one of the most important Spanish novels of the twentieth century.

Biography
Martín-Santos was born in Larache, Morocco in 1924; son of the military doctor Leandro Martín-Santos. At five years of age his family moved to San Sebastián, where he would ultimately spend most of his life. At the same time, he became interested in literature and became an habitué of the Café Gijón, where he met many prominent writers of his generation, including Ignacio Aldecoa, Rafael Sánchez Ferlosio, and Juan Benet. He also spent some time with Alfonso Sastre.

In 1951 he became director of the regional psychiatric hospital in San Sebastian and would remain there the rest of his life. He also participated in the so-called "Academia Errante," a debate forum created by restless Spanish intellectuals in the sixties who were searching for new forms of expression. He read Jean-Paul Sartre extensively and became interested in existentialism.

He married  Rocío Laffón Bayo in 1953, with whom he had three children. In 1955, he wrote a thesis entitled Dilthey, Jaspers y la comprensión del enfermo mental (Dilthey, Jaspers, and Understanding the Mentally Ill), followed in 1964 by Libertad, temporalidad y transferencia en el psicoanálisis existencial (Freedom, Temporality, and Transference in Existential Psychoanalysis). He became a member of the Partido Socialista Obrero Español (PSOE), a clandestine organization, and was thrown into prison on three occasions. Later, he joined the Executive Committee and became friends with the socialist leader Enrique Múgica Herzog.

Near the end of 1960 he finished writing the novel Tiempo de silencio, which was published in 1962 with twenty censored pages. An uncensored edition was not published until 1981. In this novel he makes innovative use of interior monologue, second-person narrative, indirect free style, stream of consciousness, and mythification; narrative devices that had been pioneered earlier by James Joyce.

His wife Rocío died, possibly a suicide, in 1963. That same year, he began writing Tiempo de destrucción (Time of Destruction), but it was left incomplete when he died in a traffic accident in Vitoria, Spain on 21 January 1964. It was published, as he left it, in 1975. The same publisher had also released a posthumous collection of his short stories, entitled Apólogos, in 1970.

Tiempo de silencio was the basis for a movie, directed by Vicente Aranda.

Works
Dilthey, Jaspers y la comprensión del enfermo mental 1955
Libertad, temporalidad y transferencia en el psicoanálisis existencial 1964

Tiempo de destrucción
Apólogos 1970

References
 Díaz Valcárcel, Emilio. La visión del mundo en la novela: Tiempo de silencio, de Luis Martín-Santos. Río Piedras: Editorial de la Universidad de Puerto Rico, 1982.
 MITXELENA Kulturunea page with short biography and three essays about Tiempo de silencio.

1924 births
1964 deaths
Spanish psychiatrists
Spanish male writers
Road incident deaths in Spain
20th-century Spanish physicians
Spanish medical writers